Pristidactylus torquatus, commonly known as lagarto de bosque, the southern grumbler, or the forest lizard, is a species of lizard in the family Iguanidae. The specific name is derived from the Latin "torquatus" meaning wearing a twisted collar or necklace. This species is endemic to the Bío Bío Region, the Araucanía Region and the Los Lagos Regions of Chile.

Description
Pristidactylus torquatus is a robust lizard with strong legs and a large head. The back is generally reddish-brown with large patches of grey and there is a dark collar around the throat. The underside is paler and the region round the vent is greenish-yellow.

Distribution and habitat
Pristidactylus torquatus is endemic to Chile where it is found on the west side of the Andes between 35° and 42° south. The regions in which it is found are Biobío, La Araucania and Los Lagos. Its natural habitat is the extensive southern beech forests (Nothofagus) that grow in this temperate climate.

Behaviour
Pristidactylus torquatus is a terrestrial species and is found mainly on the ground under the forest trees. It feeds chiefly on beetles which it chews up with its strong jaws. The female lays a clutch of about six eggs in a hole in the sand.

References

Pristidactylus
Reptiles of Chile
Reptiles described in 1861
Taxa named by Rodolfo Amando Philippi
Endemic fauna of Chile